The 2007–08 Los Angeles Lakers season was the 60th season of the franchise, 59th in the National Basketball Association (NBA) and 48th in Los Angeles. During the offseason, the Lakers re-signed point guard Derek Fisher. The Lakers celebrated their 60th anniversary, thus the Laker jerseys wore the 60th anniversary patches on the leftmost part. They finished the regular season with 57 wins, finishing with the most wins in the tightest conference race in NBA history. The Lakers clinched the top seed in the playoffs for the 29th time in franchise history. This 15-game turnaround from the prior season has been attributed to the progress of the team's bench players and the  mid-season trade for Pau Gasol. The Lakers sold out all 41 home games for the season. After 12 seasons in the NBA, Kobe Bryant was named the 2008 NBA Most Valuable Player for the first and only time in his career. The Lakers had the third best team offensive rating and the fifth best team defensive rating in the NBA.

In the playoffs, the Lakers swept the Denver Nuggets in four games in the First Round, defeated the Utah Jazz in six games in the Semifinals, and defeated the defending NBA champion San Antonio Spurs in five games in the Conference Finals to advance to the NBA Finals since 2004. In the NBA Finals, the Lakers faced off against their rivals, the Boston Celtics, renewing their storied rivalry, and marking the first time the two teams faced off against each other in the NBA Finals since 1987. However, the Lakers would lose against the Celtics in the NBA Finals in six games, ending with a blowout defeat to the Celtics in Game 6 by 39 points, losing 92–131, and marking the Lakers' ninth defeat to the Celtics in the NBA Finals.

Key dates
 June 28: The 2007 NBA draft took place in New York City.
 July 1: The free agency period started.
 October 7: The preseason started with a home game versus the Utah Jazz.
 October 28: The regular season started with a home game versus the Houston Rockets.
 February 16–17: The 2008 NBA All-Star Weekend took place.
 March 2: The Lakers matched their previous season win total (42) with an overtime win against the Dallas Mavericks.
 April 11: The Lakers clinched the Pacific Division title with a win over the New Orleans Hornets.
 April 15: The Lakers clinched the Western Conference title and concluded the regular season with a game against the Sacramento Kings.
 April 20: The Lakers played their first playoff game of the season.
 June 17: The Lakers played their final game of the playoffs against the Boston Celtics in the NBA Finals, losing 92–131.

Roster changes

Injuries and surgeries
Following the 2006–07 NBA season, their offseason was marred with surgeries to their two key players. The first of which was Lamar Odom having shoulder surgery which made him miss the first five games of the 2007–08 NBA season. The other was Kwame Brown having shoulder surgery also.

Signings
The Lakers' first signing was their first-round draft pick Javaris Crittenton. Then the Lakers re-signed Luke Walton to a six-year contract extension worth $30 million. Chris Mihm also signed a new contract for two years despite missing the entire previous season after having surgery on his right ankle. Walton was a key player last season while Mihm was sidelined for the whole season.

The most notable signing of the Lakers off-season was past hero Derek Fisher, signed to a three-year deal worth approximately $14 million. Fisher was released from the Utah Jazz at his request during the offseason so his family could move to a city that has better treatment for his daughter, who was diagnosed with retinoblastoma. The Lakers signed him in order to add stability at the point and they needed a player who was well versed in the triangle offense. The Lakers were also hoping that signing a former veteran of the Lakers would ease Bryant's demand to be traded.

Andrew Bynum and Jordan Farmar had their 4th-year and 3rd-year contracts extended respectively. This kept each player with the team for at least one more year.

D. J. Mbenga and rookie Coby Karl were also signed with the team to fill roster spots. Coby Karl, the son of Nuggets coach George Karl, switched between the NBDL and Lakers roster throughout the season. During midseason, injuries plagued the team and Ira Newble was signed to a ten-day contract. After this he signed a contract for the rest of the season.

Departures
The most notable departure was last year's starting point guard Smush Parker to the Miami Heat. Aaron McKie left the Lakers and became a voluntary coach for the 76ers. After spending one year with the Lakers, Shammond Williams left via free agency to play for Pamesa Valencia of the ACB.

Trades
Early in the season the Lakers traded Maurice Evans and under-achieving power forward Brian Cook for forward Trevor Ariza. Ariza would average 6.5 points per game, averaging only 18 minutes per game. Ariza broke his foot in practice on January 20 and missed the rest of the regular season. He returned to the Lakers on May 23.

After Andrew Bynum was injured for the rest of the season, the Lakers needed help in the front court before they risked falling out of contention in the playoff race. In February, the Lakers traded Kwame Brown, Javaris Crittenton, Aaron McKie (who was re-signed specifically for the trade), the draft rights to Marc Gasol, two first-round draft picks (2008 and 2010) and cash for Pau Gasol and a second-round draft pick in 2010. Many consider the Lakers the major benefactor of the trade. As a result, some criticized the trade as being unbalanced in excessively benefiting the Lakers. Gregg Popovich called Memphis' agreement to the terms of the trade "beyond comprehension" and suggested that the league should form a committee to "scratch all trades that make no sense". The trade became an immediate success for the Lakers, who went 22–5 with Gasol in the lineup and went on to reach the NBA Finals.

Draft picks

Los Angeles had three selections for the 2007 NBA draft. With their first-round pick, the Lakers selected Georgia Tech freshman point guard Javaris Crittenton. With their second pick coming from the Bobcats, the Lakers selected the  Chinese player Sun Yue. And with their final pick the Lakers selected Pau Gasol's younger brother, Marc. Marc Gasol and Crittenton were both traded midseason for Pau Gasol. Sun Yue spent the entire 2007–08 season playing in the ABA and China national basketball team and only played 10 games total in the NBA.

Roster

Roster notes
 Center Andrew Bynum played 35 games (his last game being on January 13, 2008) but missed the rest of the season and the playoffs due to a left knee injury.

Season summary

Following the 2006–07 NBA season the future of Kobe Bryant's career as a Laker fell into doubt, when he demanded to be traded. For a week he tiraded and the situation escalated when a videotape about him was released. The video recorded him saying that the Lakers should have traded Andrew Bynum for Jason Kidd. Bryant insulted Bynum and was critical of General Manager Mitch Kupchak. Management decided to re-sign Derek Fisher, a past hero, but the Lakers would enter the season frustrated and with question marks. 

The Lakers started the 2007–08 NBA season surprisingly well. Fueled by the emergence of Andrew Bynum as a main option at center and the return of Derek Fisher, the Lakers would even enjoy being the number one team in the Western Conference for three days. Capped by an early-season trade for Trevor Ariza, rumors of Bryant wanting to leave Los Angeles were finally beginning to die. However, before the Lakers could savor their new success, Bynum would go down with a knee injury that would take him out for the remainder of the season. Suddenly, the contending Lakers lost three straight games. The remainder of the season looked bleak for the Lakers, who were struggling to win games. It seemed that injuries, once again, would cripple another Laker season.

On February 1, the Lakers dealt the unpopular Kwame Brown (who was booed viciously by the fans for his many turnovers in recent games ), rookie Javaris Crittenton, veteran Aaron McKie, the draft rights to his brother Marc Gasol, and first-round picks in 2008 and 2010 for Spaniard all-star forward Pau Gasol and a second-round draft choice in 2010. Even while waiting for Bynum's return, the Lakers were playing very well and got a second taste of being best in the Western Conference.

With Kobe Bryant leading the charge with his MVP-caliber season, the month of April was successful for the Lakers, who quickly surged to the top of Western Conference. Aided by Pau Gasol and Lamar Odom's play as second and third options respectively, the Lakers clinched their playoff berth for the 55th time in their 60 years with the league, won the Pacific Division from the Phoenix Suns (their first since Shaq left in 2004), and clinched the number one seed in the Western Conference for the first time since the 1999–2000 NBA season. Kobe Bryant publicly announced his desire to remain as a Laker. During the second round against the Utah Jazz, Byrant was officially named the 2007–2008 NBA Most Valuable Player award, to which he promised the fans that the team would "play until June", that he was "very proud to represent [the] organization, to represent [the] city" and thanked his teammates for helping him win the MVP award for the first time in his 12-season career. He said, "the special thing about this award is that we have done it together. I can't stress it enough. This is not an individual award."

Furthermore, the team had bonded during training camp last October in Honolulu when Lamar Odom hired a chef to cook for the team. "I won't take the credit", Odom said, "but in training camp we became tighter. I made sure we had a chef. We ate dinner, lunch and breakfast together every day at training camp. I think that was special. I think that's when the bond started." Additionally, Byrant's behavior towards his teammates changed as well. "It's the little things, taking guys out to dinner, talking to guys more about things", Luke Walton said. "He's such a great player, I think sometimes it gets frustrating if we don't understand something. But he's taking the time to explain what guys are doing out there a little more. I think before he used to be a little more negative towards his teammates, as opposed to now, when he's pulling people to the side, talking to them, finding out ways to figure it out together instead of just coming down hard on them. He's definitely more patient. He's having more fun. I think he's enjoying it more, especially with the team going like this."

Playoffs summary

Denver Nuggets
In Pau Gasol's playoff debut with the Lakers, he scored 36 points, with 16 rebounds, 8 assists and 3 blocked shots, as the Lakers beat the Nuggets in Game 1. After Game 1, Kobe Bryant publicly announced his desire to remain as a Laker. Kobe Bryant gave the fans a vintage performance in Game 2 by scoring 49 points and adding 10 assists in a blowout at Staples Center. Game 2 against the Nuggets would mark a playoff first in which Lakers rookie guard Coby Karl became the first player to go against his coaching father, George Karl, in an NBA playoff game. The Nuggets were routed at home in Game 3, with Carmelo Anthony stating the team quit in the second half. Game 4 was closer, but Bryant led the Lakers with 14 points in the last five and a half minutes to close out the Nuggets at the Pepsi Center. The Lakers were the only team in 2008 to sweep an opponent in the playoffs.

Utah Jazz
The Lakers faced the Utah Jazz in the second round of the playoffs which began on May 4 at Staples Center. It was the first time the two franchises had competed in a post-season series since the 1998 Western Conference Finals. Kobe Bryant and Derek Fisher, and Utah Head Coach Jerry Sloan and Assistant Coach Phil Johnson, were the only individuals present from the 1998 series that were in this series. Conversely, it was also the first play-off series meeting between Coach Sloan and Lakers' Head Coach Phil Jackson since the Chicago Bulls defeated the Jazz in the NBA Finals that same year. The Lakers took game 1 at Staples Center, winning by 11 against the Jazz. During Game 2 against the Utah Jazz, Bryant was officially named the 2007–2008 NBA Most Valuable Player award, to which he promised the fans that the team would "play until June", that he was "very proud to represent [the] organization, to represent [the] city" and thanked his teammates for helping him win the MVP award for the first time in his 12-season career. He said, "the special thing about this award is that we have done it together. I can't stress it enough. This is not an individual award." After being presented the trophy Bryant led his team to their second victory with 34 points, 8 rebounds, and 6 assists. Having a 6–0 record in the playoffs, the Lakers traveled to Utah to play the third and fourth games of the series. However their streak would come to a sudden halt. The Jazz won both Games 3 and 4 to even up the series with Deron Williams and Carlos Boozer, who bounced back after having two terrible games at L.A., leading the team. Game 4 went to overtime which the Lakers lost for the first time this season. The series would head back to Los Angeles tied 2–2. The Lakers came back with authority as they took Game 5 with Bryant, Gasol, and Odom scoring 20-plus points each. The Jazz looked to force a Game 7 but the Lakers closed out the series in Game 6 in Utah to end the series 4–2. Their victory on the road against the Jazz marked not only an impressive road win against a team with the best home record in the league, but also the second victory a road team had notched against a home team in the entire 2007–2008 playoff Conference Semifinals, as home teams had won at a 22–2 pace.

San Antonio Spurs
The Lakers went on to face the San Antonio Spurs in the Conference Finals. The two teams combined to win seven of the last nine NBA Championships. The Lakers were able to overcome a 20-point deficit in game 1 and win behind Kobe Bryant's 27 points, with 25 being scored in the second half. Game 2 was a cruise for the Lakers as they made a 9–0 run before halftime and built the lead to 30. For the third straight series the Lakers started off 2–0. This also marked Ariza playing for the first time since breaking a bone in his right foot in January. The Spurs easily took game 3 in San Antonio with Manu Ginóbili carrying the Spurs after two terrible games in L.A. The Lakers barely escaped Game 4 with a narrow win after Brent Barry missed a last second three-pointer due to a "missed foul call" on Derek Fisher, even though Bryant, Gregg Popovich, and Phil Jackson all agreed that it was not a foul.  The NBA head office, however, admitted the next day that a foul should have been called, which would have given one of the league's top free throw shooters a chance to tie the game.  Heading home up 3–1 in the series, the Lakers trailed in the first quarter by 17 but were able to cut the lead to six by halftime. Again, Bryant stepped up by scoring 17 of his 39 points in the fourth quarter and the Lakers surged ahead to take a 100–92 victory behind their home crowd for a chance to win championship no. 15. They also improved to 4–0 against San Antonio in the Western Conference Finals.

Boston Celtics

The Lakers were able to reach the NBA Finals again as the no. 1 seed. The last time this happened to the team was during 2000, where they beat the Indiana Pacers 4–2. The Lakers looked to renew their rivalry with the Boston Celtics as the two matched up for the 11th time in the NBA Finals. The Celtics own an 8–2 record all-time against the Lakers in the NBA Finals, but were defeated by Los Angeles the last two times they met in 1985 and 1987. Entering the finals, the Celtics and the Lakers held the record for most Finals appearances (Celtics 19, Lakers 28) including the 2008 Finals, and most championships (Celtics 16, Lakers 14). The Celtics went on to win the Finals 4–2 for their 17th NBA championship.

Standings

Record vs. opponents

Game log

|- bgcolor="ffcccc"
| 1
| October 30
| Houston
| 
| Kobe Bryant (45)
| Kwame Brown, Kobe Bryant (8)
| Luke Walton, Kobe Bryant (4)
| Staples Center18,997
| 0–1

|- bgcolor="ccffcc"
| 2
| November 2
| @ Phoenix
| 
| Vladimir Radmanović (19)
| Andrew Bynum (13)
| Kobe Bryant (4)
| US Airways Center18,422
| 1-1
|- bgcolor="ccffcc"
| 3
| November 4
| Utah
| 
| Kobe Bryant (33)
| Andrew Bynum (9)
| Luke Walton (6)
| Staples Center18,997
| 2-1
|- bgcolor="ffcccc"
| 4
| November 6
| New Orleans
| 
| Kobe Bryant (28)
| Andrew Bynum (13)
| Kobe Bryant (7)
| Staples Center18,997
| 2-2
|- bgcolor="ccffcc"
| 5
| November 9
| Minnesota
| 
| Kobe Bryant (30)
| Andrew Bynum, Chris Mihm, Lamar Odom (10)
| Derek Fisher (9)
| Staples Center18,997
| 3-2
|- bgcolor="ffcccc"
| 6
| November 13
| @ San Antonio
| 
| Kobe Bryant (18)
| Andrew Bynum (12)
| Kobe Bryant (5)
| AT&T Center18,797
| 3-3
|- bgcolor="ccffcc"
| 7
| November 14
| @ Houston
| 
| Kobe Bryant (30)
| Andrew Bynum, Jordan Farmar (9)
| Kobe Bryant (5)
| Toyota Center18,178
| 4-3
|- bgcolor="ccffcc"
| 8
| November 16
| Detroit
| 
| Lamar Odom (25)
| Lamar Odom (15)
| Kobe Bryant (7)
| Staples Center18,997
| 5-3
|- bgcolor="ccffcc"
| 9
| November 18
| Chicago
| 
| Kobe Bryant (18)
| Andrew Bynum (10)
| Jordan Farmar (8)
| Staples Center18,997
| 6-3
|- bgcolor="ccffcc"
| 10
| November 20
| @ Indiana
| 
| Kobe Bryant (32)
| Andrew Bynum (10)
| Ronny Turiaf (5)
| Conseco Fieldhouse11,577
| 7-3
|- bgcolor="ffcccc"
| 11
| November 21
| @ Milwaukee
| 
| Kobe Bryant (27)
| Andrew Bynum (13)
| Kobe Bryant, Jordan Farmar, Lamar Odom (4)
| BMO Harris Bradley Center17,526
| 7-4
|- bgcolor="ffcccc"
| 12
| November 23
| @ Boston
| 
| Kobe Bryant (28)
| Andrew Bynum (9)
| Andrew Bynum, Kobe Bryant, Jordan Farmar, Ronny Turiaf, Luke Walton (3)
| TD Banknorth Garden18,624
| 7-5
|- bgcolor="ffcccc"
| 13
| November 25
| New Jersey
| 
| Kobe Bryant (31)
| Andrew Bynum (13)
| Kobe Bryant (7)
| Staples Center18,997
| 7-6
|- bgcolor="ccffcc"
| 14
| November 27
| Seattle
| 
| Kobe Bryant (35)
| Andrew Bynum (10)
| Derek Fisher (8)
| Staples Center18,997
| 8-6
|- bgcolor="ccffcc"
| 15
| November 29
| Denver
| 
| Kobe Bryant (24)
| Andrew Bynum (13)
| Kobe Bryant (7)
| Staples Center18,997
| 9-6
|- bgcolor="ffcccc"
| 16
| November 30
| @ Utah
| 
| Kobe Bryant (28)
| Andrew Bynum (10)
| Luke Walton (6)
| EnergySolutions Arena19,911
| 9-7

|- bgcolor="ffcccc"
| 17
| December 2
| Orlando
| 
| Kobe Bryant (28)
| Lamar Odom (17)
| Kobe Bryant, Derek Fisher (5)
| Staples Center18,997
| 9-8
|- bgcolor="ccffcc"
| 18
| December 4
| @ Minnesota
| 
| Kobe Bryant (20)
| Lamar Odom (9)
| Kobe Bryant (5)
| Target Center17,513
| 10-8
|- bgcolor="ccffcc"
| 19
| December 5
| @ Denver
| 
| Kobe Bryant (25)
| Kobe Bryant (8)
| Kobe Bryant, Derek Fisher (5)
| Pepsi Center19,155
| 11-8
|- bgcolor="ccffcc"
| 20
| December 9
| Golden State
| 
| Kobe Bryant (28)
| Andrew Bynum (11)
| Kobe Bryant (8)
| Staples Center18,997
| 12-8
|- bgcolor="ccffcc"
| 21
| December 13
| San Antonio
| 
| Kobe Bryant (30)
| Andrew Bynum (11)
| Luke Walton (4)
| Staples Center18,997
| 13-8
|- bgcolor="ffcccc"
| 22
| December 14
| @ Golden State
| 
| Kobe Bryant (21)
| Andrew Bynum (16)
| Kobe Bryant, Lamar Odom (5)
| Oracle Arena20,705
| 13-9
|- bgcolor="ccffcc"
| 23
| December 16
| LA Clippers
| 
| Kobe Bryant (32)
| Andrew Bynum (9)
| Vladimir Radmanovic (6)
| Staples Center18,997
| 14-9
|- bgcolor="ccffcc"
| 24
| December 18
| @ Chicago
| 
| Sasha Vujačić (19)
| Lamar Odom (16)
| Jordan Farmar (6)
| United Center22,310
| 15-9
|- bgcolor="ffcccc"
| 25
| December 20
| @ Cleveland
| 
| Kobe Bryant (21)
| Andrew Bynum, Lamar Odom (11)
| Kobe Bryant, Derek Fisher (5)
| Quicken Loans Arena20,562
| 15-10
|- bgcolor="ccffcc"
| 26
| December 21
| @ Philadelphia
| 
| Andrew Bynum (24)
| Andrew Bynum, Lamar Odom (11)
| Derek Fisher (7)
| Wachovia Center17,903
| 16-10
|- bgcolor="ccffcc"
| 27
| December 23
| @ New York
| 
| Kobe Bryant (39)
| Kobe Bryant (11)
| Kobe Bryant (8)
| Madison Square Garden19,763
| 17-10
|- bgcolor="ccffcc"
| 28
| December 25
| Phoenix
| 
| Kobe Bryant (38)
| Lamar Odom (14)
| Kobe Bryant (7)
| Staples Center18,997
| 18-10
|- bgcolor="ccffcc"
| 29
| December 28
| Utah
| 
| Kobe Bryant (31)
| Andrew Bynum (9)
| Derek Fisher (8)
| Staples Center18,997
| 19-10
|- bgcolor="ffcccc"
| 30
| December 30
| Boston
| 
| Kobe Bryant (22)
| Lamar Odom (10)
| Trevor Ariza, Kobe Bryant, Derek Fisher (3)
| Staples Center18,997
| 19-11

|- bgcolor="ccffcc"
| 31
| January 4
| Philadelphia
| 
| Javaris Crittenton (19)
| Andrew Bynum (16)
| Andrew Bynum, Kwame Brown, Kobe Bryant, Derek Fisher (4)
| Staples Center18,997
| 20-11
|- bgcolor="ccffcc"
| 32
| January 6
| Indiana
| 
| Kobe Bryant (26)
| Andrew Bynum, Lamar Odom (13)
| Luke Walton (7)
| Staples Center18,997
| 21-11
|- bgcolor="ccffcc"
| 33
| January 8
| @ Memphis
| 
| Derek Fisher (26)
| Lamar Odom (15)
| Kobe Bryant, Lamar Odom (6)
| FedEx Forum14,981
| 22-11
|- bgcolor="ccffcc"
| 34
| January 9
| @ New Orleans
| 
| Kobe Bryant (19)
| Andrew Bynum (9)
| Kobe Bryant (7)
| New Orleans Arena15,605
| 23-11
|- bgcolor="ccffcc"
| 35
| January 11
| Milwaukee
| 
| Kobe Bryant (37)
| Andrew Bynum (17)
| Kobe Bryant (7)
| Staples Center18,997
| 24-11
|- bgcolor="ccffcc"
| 36
| January 13
| Memphis
| 
| Kobe Bryant (37)
| Lamar Odom (10)
| Kobe Bryant (4)
| Staples Center18,997
| 25-11
|- bgcolor="ccffcc"
| 37
| January 14
| @ Seattle
|  (OT)
| Kobe Bryant (48)
| Lamar Odom (14)
| Lamar Odom, Luke Walton (7)
| KeyArena13,452
| 26-11
|- bgcolor="ffcccc"
| 38
| January 17
| Phoenix
| 
| Kobe Bryant (30)
| Lamar Odom (19)
| Lamar Odom (5)
| Staples Center18,997
| 26-12
|- bgcolor="ccffcc"
| 39
| January 21
| Denver
| 
| Derek Fisher (28)
| Kwame Brown, Lamar Odom (11)
| Kobe Bryant (11)
| Staples Center18,997
| 27-12
|- bgcolor="ffcccc"
| 40
| January 23
| @ San Antonio
| 
| Kobe Bryant (29)
| Kobe Bryant, Lamar Odom (12)
| Kobe Bryant (5)
| AT&T Center18,797
| 27-13
|- bgcolor="ffcccc"
| 41
| January 25
| @ Dallas
| 
| Kobe Bryant (40)
| Kobe Bryant (10)
| Kobe Bryant, Jordan Farmar (5)
| American Airlines Center20,438
| 27-14
|- bgcolor="ffcccc"
| 42
| January 27
| Cleveland
| 
| Kobe Bryant (33)
| Kobe Bryant (12)
| Kobe Bryant (6)
| Staples Center18,997
| 27-15
|- bgcolor="ccffcc"
| 43
| January 29
| New York
| 
| Kobe Bryant (24)
| Lamar Odom (12)
| Kobe Bryant (11)
| Staples Center18,997
| 28-15
|- bgcolor="ffcccc"
| 44
| January 31
| @ Detroit
| 
| Kobe Bryant (39)
| Kobe Bryant (10)
| Lamar Odom (6)
| The Palace of Auburn Hills22,076
| 28-16

|- bgcolor="ccffcc"
| 45
| February 1
| @ Raptors
| 
| Kobe Bryant (46)
| Lamar Odom (10)
| Lamar Odom (8)
| Air Canada Centre19,800
| 29-16
|- bgcolor="ccffcc"
| 46
| February 3
| @ Wizards
| 
| Kobe Bryant (30)
| Lamar Odom, Vladimir Radmanovic (7)
| Lamar Odom, Ronny Turiaf (5)
| Verizon Center20,173
| 30-16
|- bgcolor="ccffcc"
| 47
| February 5
| @ Nets
| 
| Derek Fisher (28)
| Lamar Odom (15)
| Kobe Bryant (8)
| Izod Center19,990
| 31-16
|- bgcolor="ffcccc"
| 48
| February 6
| @ Hawks
| 
| Lamar Odom (19)
| Lamar Odom (11)
| Kobe Bryant (10)
| Philips Arena19,701
| 31-17
|- bgcolor="ccffcc"
| 49
| February 8
| @ Magic
| 
| Kobe Bryant (36)
| Kobe Bryant (10)
| Derek Fisher (7)
| Amway Arena17,519
| 32-17
|- bgcolor="ccffcc"
| 50
| February 10
| @ Heat
| 
| Kobe Bryant (33)
| Lamar Odom (18)
| Lamar Odom (6)
| AmericanAirlines Arena19,600
| 33-17
|- bgcolor="ccffcc"
| 51
| February 11
| @ Bobcats
| 
| Kobe Bryant (31)
| Lamar Odom (10)
| Pau Gasol, Lamar Odom (6)
| Charlotte Bobcats Arena19,270
| 34-17
|- bgcolor="ccffcc"
| 52
| February 13
| @ Timberwolves
| 
| Kobe Bryant (29)
| Lamar Odom (16)
| Lamar Odom (10)
| Target Center13,874
| 35-17
|- bgcolor="ccffcc"
| 53
| February 19
| Hawks
| 
| Kobe Bryant, Pau Gasol (23)
| Lamar Odom (15)
| Luke Walton (5)
| Staples Center18,997
| 36-17
|- bgcolor="ccffcc"
| 54
| February 20
| @ Suns
| 
| Kobe Bryant (41)
| Lamar Odom (11)
| Kobe Bryant, Derek Fisher, Vladimir Radmanovic (3)
| US Airways Center18,422
| 37-17
|- bgcolor="ccffcc"
| 55
| February 23
| @ Clippers
| 
| Pau Gasol (23)
| Lamar Odom (10)
| Kobe Bryant (7)
| Staples Center20,236
| 38-17
|- bgcolor="ccffcc"
| 56
| February 24
| @ SuperSonics
| 
| Pau Gasol (22)
| Lamar Odom (11)
| Kobe Bryant (10)
| KeyArena at Seattle Center17,072
| 39-17
|- bgcolor="ccffcc"
| 57
| February 26
| Trail Blazers
| 
| Kobe Bryant (30)
| Lamar Odom (11)
| Kobe Bryant (7)
| Staples Center18,997
| 40-17
|- bgcolor="ccffcc"
| 58
| February 28
| Heat
| 
| Jordan Farmar (24)
| Ronny Turiaf (12)
| Kobe Bryant (8)
| Staples Center18,997
| 41-17
|- bgcolor="ffcccc"
| 59
| February 29
| @ Trail Blazers
| 
| Kobe Bryant (33)
| Lamar Odom (12)
| Kobe Bryant (5)
| Rose Garden Arena20,651
| 41-18

|- bgcolor="ccffcc"
| 60
| March 2
| Mavericks
| 
| Kobe Bryant (52)
| Pau Gasol (14)
| Pau Gasol (5)
| Staples Center18,997
| 42-18
|- bgcolor="ccffcc"
| 61
| March 4
| @ Kings
| 
| Kobe Bryant (34)
| Lamar Odom (12)
| Derek Fisher (6)
| ARCO Center17,317
| 43-18
|- bgcolor="ccffcc"
| 62
| March 7
| Clippers
| 
| Derek Fisher (17)
| Pau Gasol (11)
| Pau Gasol. Ronny Turiaf (5)
| Staples Center18,997
| 44-18
|- bgcolor="ffcccc"
| 63
| March 9
| Kings
| 
| Kobe Bryant (26)
| Lamar Odom (10)
| Pau Gasol (9)
| Staples Center18,997
| 44-19
|- bgcolor="ccffcc"
| 64
| March 11
| Raptors
| 
| Kobe Bryant (34)
| Lamar Odom (9)
| Kobe Bryant (7)
| Staples Center18,997
| 45-19
|- bgcolor="ffcccc"
| 65
| March 14
| @ Hornets
| 
| Kobe Bryant (36)
| Lamar Odom (13)
| Luke Walton (7)
| New Orleans Arena18,199
| 45-20
|- bgcolor="ffcccc"
| 66
| March 16
| @ Rockets
| 
| Kobe Bryant (24)
| Lamar Odom (11)
| Jordan Farmar, Derek Fisher (3)
| Toyota Center18,409
| 45-21
|- bgcolor="ccffcc"
| 67
| March 18
| @ Mavericks
| 
| Kobe Bryant (29)
| Lamar Odom (17)
| Kobe Bryant (7)
| American Airlines Center20,534
| 46-21
|- bgcolor="ccffcc"
| 68
| March 20
| @ Jazz
| 
| Kobe Bryant (27)
| Lamar Odom (12)
| Kobe Bryant (7)
| EnergySolutions Arena19,911
| 47-21
|- bgcolor="ccffcc"
| 69
| March 21
| SuperSonics
| 
| Kobe Bryant (23)
| Lamar Odom (12)
| Ronny Turiaf (6)
| Staples Center18,997
| 48-21
|- bgcolor="ffcccc"
| 70
| March 23
| Warriors
| 
| Kobe Bryant (36)
| Lamar Odom (22)
| Kobe Bryant (8)
| Staples Center18,997
| 48-22
|- bgcolor="ccffcc"
| 71
| March 24
| @ Warriors
| 
| Kobe Bryant (30)
| Lamar Odom (21)
| Kobe Bryant (7)
| Oracle Arena20,713
| 49-22
|- bgcolor="ffcccc"
| 72
| March 26
| Bobcats
| 
| Kobe Bryant (27)
| Lamar Odom (9)
| Vladimir Radmanovic (4)
| Staples Center18,997
| 49-23
|- bgcolor="ffcccc"
| 73
| March 28
| Grizzlies
| 
| Kobe Bryant (53)
| Lamar Odom (11)
| Lamar Odom (11)
| Staples Center18,997
| 49-24
|- bgcolor="ccffcc"
| 74
| March 30
| Wizards
| 
| Kobe Bryant (26)
| Lamar Odom (13)
| Kobe Bryant (13)
| Staples Center18,997
| 50-24

|- bgcolor="ccffcc"
| 75
| April 2
| Trail Blazers
| 
| Kobe Bryant (36)
| Kobe Bryant (13)
| Kobe Bryant, Pau Gasol (7)
| Staples Center18,997
| 51-24
|- bgcolor="ccffcc"
| 76
| April 4
| Mavericks
| 
| Lamar Odom (31)
| Kobe Bryant, Lamar Odom (10)
| Pau Gasol (7)
| Staples Center18,997
| 52-24
|- bgcolor="ccffcc"
| 77
| April 6
| Kings
| 
| Kobe Bryant (29)
| Vladimir Radmanovic (14)
| Lamar Odom (7)
| Staples Center17,317
| 53-24
|- bgcolor="ffcccc"
| 78
| April 8
| @ Trail Blazers
| 
| Kobe Bryant (34)
| Pau Gasol (13)
| Jordan Farmar (6)
| Rose Garden Arena20,435
| 53-25
|- bgcolor="ccffcc"
| 79
| April 10
| @ Clippers
| 
| Luke Walton (18)
| Lamar Odom (13)
| Jordan Farmar, Derek Fisher, Luke Walton (4)
| Staples Center20,084
| 54-25
|- bgcolor="ccffcc"
| 80
| April 11
| Hornets
| 
| Kobe Bryant (29)
| Lamar Odom (16)
| Kobe Bryant (8)
| Staples Center18,997
| 55-25
|- bgcolor="ccffcc"
| 81
| April 13
| Spurs
| 
| Kobe Bryant (20)
| Lamar Odom (14)
| Kobe Bryant (5)
| Staples Center18,997
| 56-25
|- bgcolor="ccffcc"
| 82
| April 15
| Kings
| 
| Pau Gasol (22)
| Lamar Odom (12)
| Ronny Turiaf (6)
| Staples Center18,997
| 57-25

Playoffs

|- bgcolor="#bbffbb"
| 1 || April 20 || Denver ||128–114||Gasol (36)||Gasol (16)||Gasol (8)||Staples Center 18,997|| 1–0
|- bgcolor="#bbffbb"
| 2 || April 23 || Denver ||122–107||Bryant (49)||Gasol (10)||Bryant (10)||Staples Center18,997|| 2–0
|-bgcolor="#bbffbb"
| 3 || April 26 || @ Denver ||102–84||Bryant (22)||Bryant, Odom, Radmanović (7)||Bryant (8)||Pepsi Center19,602|| 3–0
|-bgcolor="#bbffbb"
| 4 || April 28 || @ Denver ||107–101||Bryant (31)||Odom (12)||Bryant (6)||Pepsi Center19,264|| 4–0
|-

|- bgcolor="#bbffbb"
| 1 || May 4 || Utah ||109–98 || Bryant (38)|| Gasol (10) || Bryant (7) || Staples Center18,997 || 1–0
|- bgcolor="#bbffbb"
| 2 || May 7 || Utah ||120–110 || Bryant (34) || Odom (16)|| Bryant (6) || Staples Center18,997 || 2–0
|- bgcolor="edbebf"
| 3 || May 9 || @ Utah || 99–104 || Bryant (34) || Odom (12) || Bryant (7) ||EnergySolutions Arena19,911 || 2–1
|- bgcolor="edbebf"
| 4 || May 11 || @ Utah || 115–123 || Bryant (33) || Odom (13) || Bryant (10) ||EnergySolutions Arena19,911 || 2–2
|-bgcolor="#bbffbb"
| 5 || May 14 || Utah || 111–104 || Bryant (26) || Odom (11) || Gasol (8) || Staples Center18,997 || 3–2
|-bgcolor="#bbffbb"
| 6 || May 16 || @ Utah ||108–105|| Bryant (34) || Gasol (13) || Bryant (6) ||EnergySolutions Arena19,911 || 4–2
|-

|-bgcolor="#bbffbb"
| 1 || May 21 || San Antonio || 89–85 || Bryant (27) || Odom (8) || Bryant (9) || Staples Center18,997|| 1–0
|-bgcolor="#bbffbb"
| 2 || May 23 || San Antonio || 101–71 || Bryant (22) || Odom (12) || Bryant (5) || Staples Center18,997 || 2–0
|-bgcolor="#edbebf"
| 3 || May 25 || @ San Antonio || 84–103 || Bryant (30) || Odom (11) || Odom (6) || AT&T Center18,797 || 2–1
|-bgcolor="#bbffbb"
| 4 || May 27 || @ San Antonio || 93–91 || Bryant (28) || Bryant, Gasol (10) || Gasol (6) || AT&T Center18,797|| 3–1
|-bgcolor="#bbffbb"
| 5 || May 29 || San Antonio || 100–92 || Bryant (39) || Gasol (19) || Gasol (5) || Staples Center18,997 || 4–1
|-
|-

|-bgcolor="#edbebf"
| 1 || June 5 || @ Boston || 88–98 || Bryant (24) || Gasol (8) || Bryant, Fisher (6) || TD Banknorth Garden18,624 || 0–1
|-bgcolor="#edbebf"
| 2 || June 8 || @ Boston || 102–108 || Bryant (30) || Gasol, Radmanović (10) || Bryant (8) || TD Banknorth Garden18,624 || 0–2
|-bgcolor="#bbffbb"
| 3 || June 10 || Boston || 87–81 || Bryant (36) || Gasol (12) || Farmar (5) || Staples Center18,997 || 1–2
|-bgcolor="#edbebf"
| 4 || June 12 || Boston || 91–97 || Odom (19) || Gasol, Odom (10) || Bryant (10) || Staples Center18,997 || 1–3
|- bgcolor="bbffbb"
| 5 || June 15 || Boston || 103–98 || Bryant (25) || Gasol (13) || Gasol (6) || Staples Center18,997 || 2–3
|- bgcolor="#edbebf"
| 6 || June 17 || @ Boston || 92–131 || Bryant (47) || Odom (16) || Odom (5) || TD Banknorth Garden18,624 || 2–4
|-

Player stats

Regular season 

*Total for entire season including previous team(s)

Playoffs

Awards, records and milestones

All-Star Game
 Kobe Bryant was named as a starter in the 2008 NBA All-Star Game.

Awards
 Kobe Bryant was named the Western Conference Player of the Week for games played January 7, 2008 through January 13, 2008.
 Kobe Bryant was named the Western Conference Player of the Week for games played February 25, 2008 through March 2, 2008.
 Kobe Bryant was named the Western Conference Player of the Month for February 2008.
 Kobe Bryant was named the Western Conference Player of the Week for games played March 31, 2008 through April 6, 2008.
 Kobe Bryant was named the Western Conference Player of the Month for April 2008.
 Phil Jackson was named the Western Conference Coach of the Month for April 2008.

Milestones
 On December 23, 2007 Kobe Bryant became the youngest NBA player to score 20,000 points.
 Sasha Vujacic set the highest 3 pointer shot percentage for a season in Lakers history (43.7%).

Season
 Kobe Bryant was named the NBA's Most Valuable Player for the 2008 season
 Kobe Bryant was named to the All-NBA Team First Team
 Kobe Bryant was named to the NBA All-Defensive Team

Transactions
The Lakers have been involved in the following transactions during the 2007–08 season.

Trades

Free agents

References

Western Conference (NBA) championship seasons
Los Angeles Lakers seasons
Los Angle
Los Angle
Los Angle